Miandam is a hill station in Khyber Pakhtunkhwa, Pakistan, in the foothills of Hindu Kush mountains.

Miandam is enriched in medicinal plants, owing to which the town is the site of a World Wide Fund for Nature project promoting sustainable harvesting of medicinal plants, and now about 1,000 people are dependent on the medicinal plant trade for their entire income. The primary economy of the region is based on tourism and agriculture.  While agriculture is mostly centered on corn and potatoes, As of 1988, its population was 3,000; but it is now estimated to be 20,000, including neighboring hamlets.

See also

Marghazar - Swat Valley
Malam Jabba -Swat Valley
Gabina Jabba - Swat Valley
Madyan - Swat Valley
Behrain - Swat Valley
Kalam -Swat Valley
Utror - Kalam Valley
Usho - Swat Valley
Gabral -Kalam Valley

References

Hill stations in Pakistan
Tourist attractions in Swat